The 2008 Championship League was a professional non-ranking snooker tournament that was played from 25 February to 15 May 2008 at the Crondon Park Golf Club in Stock, England.

Joe Perry won in the final 3–1 against Mark Selby, and earned a place in the 2008 Premier League Snooker.

Ali Carter played in all seven qualifying groups.

Prize fund
The breakdown of prize money for this year is shown below:

Group 1–7
Winner: £3,000
Runner-up: £2,000
Semi-final: £1,000
Frame-win in league stage: £100
Frame-win in play-offs: £300
Winners group
Winner: £10,000
Runner-up: £5,000
Semi-final: £3,000
Frame-win in league stage: £200
Frame-win in play-offs: £300

Tournament total: £175,600

Group one
Group one matches were played on 25 and 26 February 2008. Ryan Day was the first player to qualify for the winners group.

Matches

 Ken Doherty 3–1 Mark Williams
 Ali Carter 0–4 Ryan Day
 Joe Perry 2–2 Barry Hawkins
 Matthew Stevens 1–3 Ken Doherty
 Mark Williams 3–1 Ali Carter
 Ryan Day 1–3 Joe Perry
 Barry Hawkins 1–3 Matthew Stevens 
 Ken Doherty 1–3 Ali Carter 
 Mark Williams 2–2 Ryan Day
 Joe Perry 2–2 Matthew Stevens
 Ali Carter 4–0 Matthew Stevens
 Barry Hawkins 3–1 Ryan Day
 Ken Doherty 2–2 Barry Hawkins
 Mark Williams 1–3 Joe Perry
 Ryan Day 2–2 Matthew Stevens
 Ali Carter 3–1 Barry Hawkins
 Ken Doherty 2–2 Joe Perry
 Mark Williams 2–2 Matthew Stevens
 Mark Williams 3–1 Barry Hawkins
 Ali Carter 2–2 Joe Perry
 Ken Doherty 1–3 Ryan Day

Table

Play-offs

Group two
Group two matches were played on 27 and 28 February 2008. Ken Doherty was the second player to qualify for the winners group.

Matches

 Joe Perry 2–2 Ali Carter
 Ken Doherty 3–1 Mark Williams
 Joe Swail 1–3 Nigel Bond
 Anthony Hamilton 3–1 Joe Perry
 Ali Carter 3–1 Ken Doherty
 Mark Williams 1–3 Joe Swail
 Nigel Bond 2–2 Anthony Hamilton
 Joe Perry 1–3 Ken Doherty
 Ali Carter 4–0 Mark Williams
 Joe Swail 1–3 Anthony Hamilton
 Ken Doherty 2–2 Anthony Hamilton
 Nigel Bond 1–3 Mark Williams
 Joe Perry 2–2 Nigel Bond
 Ali Carter 2–2 Joe Swail
 Mark Williams 4–0 Anthony Hamilton
 Ken Doherty 3–1 Nigel Bond
 Joe Perry 3–1 Joe Swail
 Ali Carter 1–3 Anthony Hamilton
 Ali Carter 3–1 Nigel Bond
 Ken Doherty 1–3 Joe Swail
 Joe Perry 3–1 Mark Williams

Table

Play-offs

Group three
Group three matches were played on 10 and 11 March 2008. Anthony Hamilton was the third player to qualify for the winners group.

Matches

 Ali Carter 2–2 Anthony Hamilton
 Michael Holt 1–3 Joe Swail
 Shaun Murphy 3–1 Mark Selby
 Stuart Bingham 0–4 Ali Carter
 Anthony Hamilton 3–1 Michael Holt
 Joe Swail 1–3 Shaun Murphy
 Mark Selby 2–2 Stuart Bingham
 Ali Carter 3–1 Michael Holt
 Anthony Hamilton 4–0 Joe Swail
 Shaun Murphy 3–1 Stuart Bingham
 Michael Holt 2–2 Stuart Bingham
 Mark Selby 3–1 Joe Swail
 Ali Carter 3–1 Mark Selby
 Anthony Hamilton 1–3 Shaun Murphy
 Joe Swail 2–2 Stuart Bingham
 Michael Holt 1–3 Mark Selby 
 Ali Carter 2–2 Shaun Murphy
 Anthony Hamilton 2–2 Stuart Bingham
 Anthony Hamilton 1–3 Mark Selby
 Michael Holt 0–4 Shaun Murphy
 Ali Carter 4–0 Joe Swail

Table

Play-offs

Group four
Group four matches were played on 12 and 13 March 2008. Shaun Murphy was the fourth player to qualify for the winners group.

Matches

 Shaun Murphy 1–3 Ali Carter
 Mark Allen 2–2 Stuart Bingham
 Jamie Cope 0–4 Shaun Murphy
 Joe Perry 2–2 Mark King
 Ali Carter 2–2 Mark Allen
 Stuart Bingham 2–2 Joe Perry
 Mark King 3–1 Jamie Cope
 Shaun Murphy 1–3 Mark Allen
 Ali Carter 2–2 Stuart Bingham
 Joe Perry 1–3 Jamie Cope
 Mark Allen 3–1 Jamie Cope
 Mark King 3–1 Stuart Bingham
 Shaun Murphy 3–1 Mark King
 Ali Carter 2–2 Joe Perry
 Stuart Bingham 2–2 Jamie Cope
 Mark Allen 2–2 Mark King
 Shaun Murphy 2–2 Joe Perry
 Ali Carter 3–1 Jamie Cope
 Joe Perry 3–1 Mark Allen
 Ali Carter 2–2 Mark King
 Shaun Murphy 3–1 Stuart Bingham

Table

Play-offs

Group five
Group five matches were played on 14 and 15 April 2008. Joe Perry was the fifth player to qualify for the winners group.

Matches

 Ali Carter 2–2 Mark King
 Mark Allen 2–2 Joe Perry
 Stephen Lee 0–4 Neil Robertson
 Dominic Dale 0–4 Ali Carter
 Mark King 2–2 Mark Allen
 Joe Perry 2–2 Stephen Lee
 Neil Robertson 3–1 Dominic Dale
 Ali Carter 2–2 Mark Allen
 Joe Perry 1–3 Mark King 
 Stephen Lee 2–2 Dominic Dale
 Mark Allen 4–0 Dominic Dale
 Neil Robertson 2–2 Joe Perry
 Ali Carter 1–3 Neil Robertson
 Mark King 4–0 Stephen Lee
 Joe Perry 3–1 Dominic Dale
 Mark Allen 1–3 Neil Robertson
 Ali Carter 1–3 Stephen Lee
 Mark King 2–2 Dominic Dale
 Mark King 3–1 Neil Robertson
 Mark Allen 3–1 Stephen Lee
 Ali Carter 0–4 Joe Perry

Table

Play-offs

Group six
Group six matches were played on 16 and 17 April 2008. Mark Selby was the sixth player to qualify for the winners group.

Matches

 Mark King 3–1 Mark Allen
 Neil Robertson 3–1 Ali Carter
 Mark Selby 3–1 Gerard Greene
 Jimmy White 3–1 Mark King
 Ali Carter 1–3 Mark Selby
 Mark Allen 1–3 Neil Robertson
 Gerard Greene 1–3 Jimmy White 
 Mark King 2–2 Neil Robertson
 Mark Allen 1–3 Ali Carter
 Mark Selby 4–0 Jimmy White
 Neil Robertson 3–1 Jimmy White
 Gerard Greene 1–3 Ali Carter
 Mark Selby 3–1 Mark Allen
 Mark King 2–2 Gerard Greene
 Ali Carter 4–0 Jimmy White
 Neil Robertson 3–1 Gerard Greene
 Mark Selby 2–2 Mark King
 Mark Allen 1–3 Jimmy White
 Mark Allen 3–1 Gerard Greene
 Neil Robertson 2–2 Mark Selby
 Mark King 3–1 Ali Carter

Table

Play-offs

Group seven
Group seven matches were played on 12 and 13 May 2008. Mark King was the last player to qualify for the winners group.

Matches

 Neil Robertson 2–2 Mark King
 Ali Carter 1–3 Jimmy White
 Ian McCulloch 1–3 Fergal O'Brien
 Dave Harold 1–3 Neil Robertson
 Mark King 2–2 Ali Carter
 Jimmy White 1–3 Ian McCulloch
 Fergal O'Brien 3–1 Dave Harold
 Neil Robertson 3–1 Ali Carter
 Mark King 3–1 Jimmy White
 Ian McCulloch 1–3 Dave Harold
 Ali Carter 0–4 Dave Harold
 Fergal O'Brien 3–1 Jimmy White
 Neil Robertson 1–3 Fergal O'Brien
 Mark King 1–3 Ian McCulloch
 Jimmy White 2–2 Dave Harold
 Ali Carter 1–3 Fergal O'Brien
 Neil Robertson 3–1 Ian McCulloch
 Mark King 1–3 Dave Harold
 Mark King 2–2 Fergal O'Brien
 Ali Carter 4–0 Ian McCulloch
 Neil Robertson 2–2 Jimmy White

Table

Play-offs

Winners group
The matches of the winners group were played on 14 and 15 May 2008. Joe Perry has qualified to the 2008 Premier League.

Matches

 Ryan Day 3–1 Ken Doherty
 Anthony Hamilton 1–3 Shaun Murphy
 Joe Perry 1–3 Mark Selby
  Mark King 1–3 Ryan Day 
 Ken Doherty 4–0 Anthony Hamilton
 Shaun Murphy 4–0 Joe Perry
 Mark Selby 4–0 Mark King
 Ryan Day 1–3 Anthony Hamilton
 Ken Doherty 1–3 Shaun Murphy
 Joe Perry 2–2 Mark King
 Anthony Hamilton 1–3 Mark King
 Mark Selby 3–1 Shaun Murphy
 Ryan Day 3–1 Mark Selby
  Ken Doherty 0–4 Joe Perry
 Shaun Murphy 3–1 Mark King
 Anthony Hamilton 1–3 Mark Selby
 Ryan Day 2–2 Joe Perry
 Ken Doherty 2–2 Mark King
 Ken Doherty 3–1 Mark Selby
 Anthony Hamilton 2–2 Joe Perry
 Ryan Day 3–1 Shaun Murphy

Table

Play-offs

Century breaks
Total:76

143, 143, 129, 125, 122, 119, 113, 112, 107, 104, 104  Ali Carter
143, 133, 120, 101  Dave Harold
142, 140, 127, 116, 108, 103, 102, 102, 102, 101, 100  Neil Robertson
137, 134, 122, 105, 102  Ryan Day
129, 126, 113, 101, 101, 100  Ken Doherty
129, 114, 107, 104, 100, 100  Joe Perry
128, 128, 117, 112, 112, 105, 105  Shaun Murphy
128, 128  Stuart Bingham
126, 108, 107, 107, 107, 104, 103, 100  Anthony Hamilton
125, 119  Jamie Cope
125, 117  Mark King
124, 112  Fergal O'Brien
114  Mark Williams
113  Gerard Greene
112, 110, 105  Jimmy White
109, 108, 100  Mark Allen
103, 100  Mark Selby

Winnings 

Green: Won the group. All prize money in GBP.

Source=Championship League Snooker by Matchroom Sport

References

External links
 

2008
Championship League
Championship League